Tolkien tourism is a phenomenon of fans of The Lord of the Rings fictional universe travelling to sites of film- and book-related significance. It is especially notable in New Zealand, site of the movie trilogy by Peter Jackson, where it is credited as having raised the annual tourism numbers.

Origins
The three films (The Lord of the Rings: The Fellowship of the Ring, The Lord of the Rings: The Two Towers, and The Lord of the Rings: The Return of the King) based on the novel The Lord of the Rings by J. R. R. Tolkien were shot in various locations throughout New Zealand, and many of these locations have been preserved and altered to encourage the tourism that makes up a significant portion of the country's economy. On some Lord of the Rings film location tours, tourists are provided time to indulge in cosplay, and dress as characters from the books or films.

In New Zealand

New Zealand is in a unique position to capitalize on its scenery. Tolkien tourist attention is less geared towards visiting New Zealand's national parks and more focused on scenery that was used as back drops in movies. For example, Mount Olympus, dramatic pillars of rock carved out by nature and time, sits in Kahurangi National Park near Nelson in a remote corner of the South Island. Since it featured in The Fellowship of the Ring, the first of The Lord of the Rings trilogy, Mount Olympus has become a spot for Tolkien tourists.

Mount Sunday, in a remote area west of the Canterbury plains (upper reaches of the Rangitata Valley near Erewhon) served as the location of Edoras. Although no traces of the filming remain, complete day tour packages to it are available from Christchurch.

Film NZ—the national film promotion board—advertises that New Zealand offers an English-speaking, largely nonunion work force, along with a kaleidoscope of urban and rural landscapes. "Experience New Zealand, Home of Middle Earth," urges Tourism New Zealand's Web site, and once tourists get there, they are invited to find film locations around New Zealand with a free "Middle Earth map." Currently New Zealand is negotiating with Peter Jackson and New Line Cinema, the films' producers, to construct a permanent Lord of the Rings museum for some of the 40,000 props and costumes now warehoused in New Zealand.

Jan Howard Finder, the science fiction writer, has organized special hostel-based tours of New Zealand to see places filmed in Lord of the Rings.

Economic effects

The annual tourist influx to New Zealand grew 40%, from 1.7 million in 2000 to 2.4 million in 2006, which some have attributed to be to a large degree due to The Lord of the Rings phenomenon. 6% of international visitors cited the film as a reason for traveling to the country. "You can argue that Lord of the Rings was the best unpaid advertisement that New Zealand has ever had", said Bruce Lahood, United States and Canadian regional manager for Tourism New Zealand. An article published by The New York Times contradicts Lahood, stating that New Zealand subsidized the movie trilogy with $150 million.

The Hobbit filming

Many experts and New Zealanders hoped for a renewed Tolkien effect because The Hobbit was also filmed in New Zealand.

Whether or not this was vitally important to New Zealand's tourism industry was a big debating point during short-lived fears that industrial disputes could make the film production occur outside of the country. The government of New Zealand also saw some criticism for increasing movie subsidies and creating laws tailored for US movie companies, solely out of fear of losing the production. Some have subsequently called the price of $25 million (in further financial subsidies and specific laws made for the producers benefit) that New Zealand had to pay to retain the movie 'extortionate' and argued that the discussion had occurred in a climate of 'hyperbole and hysteria'. An even higher price of at least $109 million has also been cited.

South Africa and the United Kingdom

Tolkien tourism has also existed to a lesser extent independent from the Jackson movies, in places associated with him in England and South Africa.

Tolkien worked for much of his career in Oxford, England. The colleges where Tolkien taught, the pubs that he and the Inklings frequented, the church he attended, and his former homes in the city all attract tourist interest. The Eagle and Child pub in particular capitalises on Tolkien's former patronage in its signage and interior decoration. The Tolkien Society organises the Oxonmoot in one of the colleges September each year. In 1992 the centennial was celebrated in Oxford.

Tolkien lived first near and then in Birmingham, England for most of his childhood. In 2005, The Tolkien Society hosted Tolkien 2005 at Aston University in the city where Tolkien lived and taught for many years to celebrate The Lord of the Rings 50th anniversary.

Tolkien was born in Bloemfontein, Free State, South Africa on 3 January 1892. The Bank of Africa building site has been recovered (a commemoration plaque used to be on the new building on the lot but this was moved elsewhere due to theft risk), the grave of Tolkien's father has been recovered and a new tombstone erected. In addition, the Anglican church where Tolkien was baptized still stands, inclusive of the baptism font. Tolkien's father's last will and testament (written in Dutch) can also be read at one of the municipal offices. The National Afrikaans Literary Museum also has a number of copies of Die Smid van Groot-Wootton.

See also

 Impact on popular culture of the Lord of the Rings

References

Tolkien fandom
Middle-earth (film franchise)
Tourism in New Zealand
Types of tourism
Matamata
Cultural tourism